Idiosoma is a genus of Australian armored trapdoor spiders that was first described by Anton Ausserer in 1871. Originally placed with the Ctenizidae, it was moved to the armored trapdoor spiders in 1985.

The skin of their opisthosoma is hardened, with a flattened end and deep grooves running along the sides. The thickened skin helps to reduce water loss in its dry habitat. It also serves as a kind of plug to shield itself from predators. This phenomenon is called phragmosis and occurs in perfection in the spider genus Cyclocosmia (Ctenizidae). However, some parasitic wasps have evolved paper-thin abdomens and long, slender ovipositors and lay their eggs on the softer skin at the front of the spider's opisthosoma.

When prey triggers any of the trip-lines radiating from the burrow's entrance, the spider runs out of the burrow to capture ants, beetles, cockroaches, millipedes and moths. This is unlike many trapdoor spiders that very rarely leave their burrow. Males actively look for females, and mating takes place in the female's burrow. She lays her eggs during late spring and early summer. The spiderlings hatch in mid-summer, and stay inside the burrow until early winter, when the climate gets more humid.

Species
 it contains twenty-nine species:
Idiosoma arenaceum Rix & Harvey, 2018 – Australia (Western Australia)
Idiosoma berlandi (Rainbow, 1914) – Australia (New South Wales)
Idiosoma castellum (Main, 1986) – Australia (Western Australia)
Idiosoma clypeatum Rix & Harvey, 2018 – Australia (Western Australia)
Idiosoma corrugatum Rix & Harvey, 2018 – Australia (South Australia)
Idiosoma cupulifex (Main, 1957) – Australia (Western Australia)
Idiosoma dandaragan Rix & Harvey, 2018 – Australia (Western Australia)
Idiosoma formosum Rix & Harvey, 2018 – Australia (Western Australia)
Idiosoma galeosomoides Rix, Main, Raven & Harvey, 2017 – Australia (Western Australia)
Idiosoma gardneri Rix & Harvey, 2018 – Australia (Western Australia)
Idiosoma gutharuka Rix & Harvey, 2018 – Australia (Western Australia)
Idiosoma incomptum Rix & Harvey, 2018 – Australia (Western Australia)
Idiosoma intermedium Rix & Harvey, 2018 – Australia (Western Australia)
Idiosoma jarrah Rix & Harvey, 2018 – Australia (Western Australia)
Idiosoma kopejtkaorum Rix & Harvey, 2018 – Australia (Western Australia)
Idiosoma kwongan Rix & Harvey, 2018 – Australia (Western Australia)
Idiosoma manstridgei (Pocock, 1897) – Australia (Western Australia)
Idiosoma mcclementsorum Rix & Harvey, 2018 – Australia (Western Australia)
Idiosoma mcnamarai Rix & Harvey, 2018 – Australia (Western Australia)
Idiosoma montanum (Faulder, 1985) – Australia (New South Wales)
Idiosoma nigrum Main, 1952 – Australia (Western Australia)
Idiosoma occidentale (Hogg, 1903) – Australia (Western Australia, South Australia)
Idiosoma planites (Faulder, 1985) – Australia (New South Wales)
Idiosoma rhaphiduca (Rainbow & Pulleine, 1918) – Australia (Western Australia)
Idiosoma schoknechtorum Rix & Harvey, 2018 – Australia (Western Australia)
Idiosoma sigillatum (O. Pickard-Cambridge, 1870) (type) – Australia (Western Australia)
Idiosoma smeatoni (Hogg, 1902) – Australia (South Australia)
Idiosoma subtriste (O. Pickard-Cambridge, 1877) – Australia (South Australia)
Idiosoma winsori (Faulder, 1985) – Australia (Victoria)

References

Further reading
 Australian Museum Online (2003): Black Rugose Trapdoor Spider fact sheet — with picture
  (1952): Notes on the genus Idiosoma, a supposedly rare Western Australian trap-door spider. W. Aust. Nat. 3: 130–137.
  (1957): Biology of aganippine trapdoor spiders (Mygalomorphae: Ctenizidae). Aust. J. Zool. 5: 402–473.
  (1985): Further studies on the systematics of ctenizid trapdoor spiders: A review of the Australian genera (Araneae: Mygalomorphae: Ctenizidae). Aust. J. Zool. (suppl. Ser.) 108: 1-84.

Fauna of Western Australia
Idiopidae
Mygalomorphae genera
Spiders of Australia
Taxa named by Anton Ausserer